A Fool's Advice is a 1932 American pre-Code film directed by Ralph Ceder. The film is also known as His Honor the Mayor (American alternative title) and Meet the Mayor (American reissue title). It was produced by its star, Frank Fay, and released by Warner Bros. Pictures.

Cast 
Frank Fay as Spencer Brown
Nat Pendleton as Kelly - Naughty Boy
Edward J. Nugent as Steve
Ruth Hall as Norma Baker
Berton Churchill as Mayor Martin Sloan
George Meeker as Harry Bayliss
Hale Hamilton as George Diamond
Esther Howard as Miss Prescott
Franklin Pangborn as Egbert - Hotel Clerk
Mike Donlin as Mr. Wimple
Eddie Borden as Catlett
Al Hill as Kelly's Henchman

1937 reissue
A Fool's Advice was re-released as Meet the Mayor. Frank Fay had a terrible reputation in show business, owing to an exceptionally large ego and a history of abusing people verbally and physically. Warner Bros. declined to handle the reissue of A Fool's Advice, but did agree to refilm the title sequence. These new credits reflect the low regard Fay's professional colleagues had for him: his name appears in the smallest possible type as both star and author, with the supporting cast members' names more than twice the size of Fay's.

References

External links 

1932 films
1932 comedy films
American black-and-white films
American comedy films
Films directed by Ralph Ceder
Warner Bros. films
Films scored by Edward Ward (composer)
1930s English-language films
1930s American films